The 2022 Air Force Falcons football team represented the United States Air Force Academy in the 2022 NCAA Division I FBS football season. The season was the team's 68th overall, 24th as a member of the Mountain West Conference, and 9th in the Mountain West's Mountain Division. The team played their home games at Falcon Stadium and were led by 16th-year head coach Troy Calhoun.

Previous season 
The Falcons finished the 2021 season with a record of 10–3 and of 6–2 in the Mountain West. They were invited to participate in the Servpro First Responder Bowl, in which they defeated the Louisville Cardinals 31–28.

Preseason

Departures 
These players graduated at the conclusion of the 2021–22 academic year and as such left the team following the previous season.

NFL Draft 

One player from the team was selected in the NFL Draft prior to this season.

Personnel

Roster 

The Falcons' roster will be announced in advance of the Mountain West's media day, which will be held in July 2022.

Coaching staff

Schedule

Game summaries

No. 21 (FCS) Northern Iowa

Colorado

at Wyoming

Nevada

Navy

at Utah State

at UNLV

Boise State

vs. Army

New Mexico

Colorado State

at San Diego State

vs. Baylor (Armed Forces Bowl)

Rankings

References

Air Force
Air Force Falcons football seasons
Armed Forces Bowl champion seasons
Air Force Falcons football